The  is an annual art show of fan-made Nintendo Famicom cartridge designs hosted by METEOR, an art gallery based in Tokyo, Japan. The exhibition celebrated its 17th anniversary in 2021.

Since 2015, website Itch.io has hosted a game development competition based on "My Famicase Exhibition" submissions.

In November 2021, the show was brought to Hong Kong under the name "My Famicase Exhibition Hong Kong". It is their first event outside of Japan. All 253 works from the 2021 submissions were exhibited, visitors could also vote for their favorite "Famicase" just like in Japan.

References

External links
 (Japanese)
My Famicase Exhibition Chronicle: https://famicase.com/chronicle/index.html (Japanese)
METEOR official website: https://super-meteor.com (Japanese)

Video game culture
Exhibitions
Nintendo Entertainment System
Home video game consoles
Third-generation video game consoles